The thistle mistletoe formula is a pagan Norse Runic formula, involving several rhyming words ending in -istill (typically at least þistill and mistill; thistle and mistletoe). The formula is attested in around 15 variants from the Viking age.

Attestations

Ledberg stone (Ög 181)
The Swedish Ledberg stone from Östergötland contains the formula. Following a standard memorial inscription, we read
ᚦᛘᚴ ᛬ ᛁᛁᛁ ᛬ ᛋᛋᛋ ᛬ ᛏᛏᛏ ᛬ ᛁᛁᛁ ᛬ ᛚᛚᛚ ᛬
þmk : iii : sss : ttt : iii : lll :

which when resolved becomes, in normalized Old Icelandic spelling:

þistill, mistill, kistill

in English:
"thistle, mistletoe, casket."

Gørlev stone (DR 239)
Likewise, the Danish Gørlev stone contains the exact same formula, along with a younger futhark rune-row.

Saga of Bósi
The formula reaches its climax in a riddle in the legendary Icelandic Saga of Bósi and Herraud, where it reads (from manuscript AM. 586 4:0, transliterated into the Latin alphabet):
r.o.þ.k.m.u. iiiiii. ssssss. tttttt. iiiiii. llllll

resolved and normalized, we get
ristill, eistill, þistill, kistill, mistill, vistill

in English:
"plowshare, testicle, thistle, box/casket, mistletoe." The meaning of the final word, uistil (vistill), is unclear.

References

Historical runic magic